The men's cycling omnium at the 2012 Olympic Games in London took place at the London Velopark on 4 and 5 August.

Lasse Norman Hansen from Denmark won the gold medal. France's Bryan Coquard won silver and Ed Clancy from Great Britain took bronze.

Competition format

The omnium competition consisted of six events, with a point-for-place system. In case of a tie on points the time trial counts.

 Points race: a  points race, with scoring for intermediate sprints as well as for lapping the pack.
 Elimination race: a "miss-and-out" elimination race, with the last rider in every sprint (each two laps) eliminated.
 Individual pursuit: a  individual pursuit, with placing based on time.
 Scratch race: a  scratch race, with all riders competing at once and first across the line winning.
 Time trial: a  time trial, with two riders (starting opposite the track) riding at once.

Schedule 
All times are British Summer Time

Overall results

FL: 250m flying lap. PR: Points race. ER: Elimination race.
IP: 4000m individual pursuit. SR: Scratch race. TT: 1000m time trial.

Event results

Flying lap

Points race

Elimination race

Individual pursuit

Scratch race

Time trial

References

Track cycling at the 2012 Summer Olympics
Cycling at the Summer Olympics – Men's omnium
Men's events at the 2012 Summer Olympics